St. Joseph's College of Engineering is a higher education institution in Chennai, India. It is under the administration of the Jeppiaar Educational Trust. The college is granted with Autonomous Status.

Location
It is accessible by the East Coast Road (ECR).

Academic departments
St.Joseph's College of engineering consists of the following academic departments.
 Department of Computer Science and Engineering
 Department of Electronics & Communication Engineering
 Department of Electrical & Electronics Engineering
 Department of Mechanical Engineering
 Department of Electronics and Instrumentation Engineering
 Department of Instrumentation and control engineering
 Department of Information Technology
 Department of Bio-Technology
 Department of Chemical Engineering

In addition, SJCE has the following courses for master's degrees:

 Master of Engineering in Power Electronics and Drives
 Master of Engineering in Applied Electronics
 Master of Engineering in Computer Science and Engineering
 Master of Science in Computer Technology
 Master of Business Administration
 Master of Engineering in Power Systems
 Master of Engineering in Software Engineering 
 Master of Engineering in Manufacturing Engineering
 Master of Engineering in Control and Instrumentation Engineering
 M.B.A. - Stands for Master of Business Administration.
 Master of Computer Applications
 Master of Technology in Biotechnology

Rankings

The National Institutional Ranking Framework (NIRF) ranked it 183 among engineering colleges in 2021.

References

External links
St.Joseph's College of Engineering website
Anna University official website

Engineering colleges in Chennai
Colleges affiliated to Anna University
Educational institutions established in 1994
1994 establishments in Tamil Nadu
Academic institutions formerly affiliated with the University of Madras